Immortal Song (Lahn al-Kholood ) is a 1952 Egyptian romance/drama film directed by Henry Barakat. It stars Farid Al Atrache, Faten Hamama, Majda, Madiha Yousri, and Seraj Munir.

Plot 
Waheed (Farid Al Atrache), a famous music composer, meets Wafa' (Faten Hamama), a family member and the daughter of a close friend and relative of his. Wafa' has secretly had a crush on him for years and tries unsuccessfully to show her affection and hint that to Waheed. He thinks her love is nothing more than an expected family member's fondness.

Wafa's father dies and Waheed offers her and her sister to move into his house and live with him and promises to take care of them. Wafa' finds herself living under the same roof with the man she loves, except that Waheed is going to marry a woman named Siham (Madiah Yousri). Time passes and Wafa' tries hardly to express her love to Waheed. She treats him well and pampers him and he eventually falls in love with her.

Cast 
Farid Al Atrache as Wahid
Faten Hamama as Wafa'
Magda as Sana
Seraj Munir as Abdel Halim
Salah Nazmi as Rashad
Madiha Yousri as Siham

See also
 Cinema of Egypt

References 
 Film summary, Faten Hamama's official site. Retrieved on January 11, 2007.
 Film summary, Adab wa Fan. Retrieved on January 11, 2007.

External links 
 

1952 films
1950s Arabic-language films
1950s mystery drama films
1952 romantic drama films
Egyptian romantic drama films
Egyptian black-and-white films
Egyptian mystery drama films